Chhepchher is a musical instrument of Mizoram, northeastern India. It is a six-stringed guitar which became popular with the Mizo people during World War II and is taught to girls and boys from a young age.

References

Indian musical instruments
Culture of Mizoram
Guitars